Gnathifera (from the Greek gnáthos, “jaw”, and the Latin -fera, “bearing”) is a clade of generally small spiralians characterized by complex jaws made of chitin. It comprises the phyla Gnathostomulida, Rotifera, Micrognathozoa, and Chaetognatha. It may also include the Cycliophora.

Gnathiferans include some of the most abundant phyla. Rotifers are among the most diverse and abundant freshwater animals and chaetognaths are among the most abundant marine plankton.

Description

The most distinctive characteristic of gnathiferans is the presence of complex sclerotized mouthparts made of chitin.

In most gnathiferans, the anus opens on the dorsal surface of the animal. In micrognathozoans and gnathostomulids, the anus is transient and only forms during defecation. Unlike other gnathiferans, in chaetognaths and Amiskwia the anus is located on the ventral surface in a subterminal position.

Development

All known gnathiferans are direct developers. Though gnathiferans are included in Spiralia, rotifers and chaetognaths do not exhibit spiral cleavage. Little is known of the development of micrognathozoans. The development of gnathostomulids is poorly known, but they appear to exhibit spiral cleavage.

Classification

Gnathifera is a member of Spiralia. It is the sister taxon of a clade comprising all other spiralians. Before the cladistic era, most gnathiferans were regarded as aschelminths, a grouping now recognized as polyphyletic.

Chaetognaths exhibit numerous morphological similarities to rotifers, suggesting that they may be sister taxa. However, based on molecular data, micrognathozoans may be more closely related to rotifers than chaetognaths.

Rotifera comprises four subclades: Seisonida, Acanthocephala, Bdelloidea, and Monogononta. Acanthocephalans were traditionally excluded from Rotifera, but it is now known that rotifers are paraphyletic without including acanthocephalans. Some taxonomists call the clade of rotifers including acanthocephalans Syndermata, but others continue to use Rotifera and regard acanthocephalans as rotifers. Numerous hypotheses of rotifer interrelationships exist.

The enigmatic phylum Cycliophora may belong to Gnathifera, but other studies suggest that it is more closely related to the Entoprocta.

Fossil record

The fossil record of gnathiferans is poor. There are no known fossil gnathostomulids. Fossils of the extant rotifer genus Habrotrocha are known from Dominican amber dating to the late Eocene, but rotifers are otherwise only known from the Holocene. By contrast, the chaetognath fossil record, while still patchy, includes numerous Paleozoic specimens. Protoconodonts are stem-group chaetognaths. The earliest protoconodonts date to the Fortunian age of the Cambrian, and are among the oldest known bilaterians. The enigmatic Cambrian taxon Amiskwia is a gnathiferan and may also be a stem-group chaetognath. The Cambrian ectoparasite Inquicus appears to be a gnathiferan.

History

Gnathifera was named in 1995 to unite gnathostomulids and rotifers. Micrognathozoans were soon added to this grouping. Chaetognaths, long considered a distinct lineage with no close relatives, were identified as gnathiferans in 2019.

A similar grouping, Acanthognatha, was suggested in 1998 to unite gastrotrichs with gnathostomulids and rotifers. However, gastrotrichs are more closely related to lophotrochozoans than gnathiferans.

References

Platyzoa
Protostome unranked clades